Value of money may refer to:

Time value of money
Present value
Value (economics),
Value for Money, a 1955 British comedy film directed by Ken Annakin and starring John Gregson
Time value of money, purchasing power of money as it varies over time